The Pro-Design Titan is an Austrian single-place paraglider that was designed and produced by Pro-Design of Natters in the mid-2000s. It is now out of production.

Design and development
The aircraft was designed as an advanced and cross country glider.

The models are each named for their relative size.

Variants
Titan M
Mid-sized model for medium-weight pilots. The glider model is DHV 2 certified.
Titan L
Large-sized model for heavier pilots. The glider model is DHV 2 certified.
Titan XL
Extra large-sized model for heavier pilots. The glider model is DHV 2 certified.

Specifications (Titan M)

References

Titan
Paragliders